Tivadar Kanizsa (4 April 1933 – 4 November 1975) was a Hungarian water polo player who competed in the  1956 Summer Olympics, in the 1960 Summer Olympics, and in the 1964 Summer Olympics.

He was born in Debrecen and died in Jásztelek.

Kanizsa was part of the Hungarian team which won the gold medal in the 1956 tournament. He played two matches.

Four years later he was a member of the Hungarian team which won the bronze medal in the 1960 Olympic tournament. He played six matches and scored six goals.

At the 1964 Games he won his second gold medal with the Hungarian team. He played five matches and scored one goal.

See also
 Hungary men's Olympic water polo team records and statistics
 List of Olympic champions in men's water polo
 List of Olympic medalists in water polo (men)
 Blood in the Water match

External links
 

1933 births
1975 deaths
Hungarian male water polo players
Olympic water polo players of Hungary
Water polo players at the 1956 Summer Olympics
Water polo players at the 1960 Summer Olympics
Water polo players at the 1964 Summer Olympics
Olympic gold medalists for Hungary
Olympic bronze medalists for Hungary
Olympic medalists in water polo
Medalists at the 1964 Summer Olympics
Medalists at the 1960 Summer Olympics
Medalists at the 1956 Summer Olympics
Sportspeople from Debrecen
20th-century Hungarian people